Presidential elections were held in Djibouti on 9 April 2021. Incumbent president Ismaïl Omar Guelleh was re-elected for his fifth five-year term, having served in the role since 1999. Most of the opposition boycotted the election.

Background
Guelleh has served as President of Djibouti since 1999, and was re-elected in the first round of the last election in 2016, which was boycotted by opposition parties.

Electoral system 
The president is elected through a two-round system for a five year term. A candidate who gets the majority of votes in the first round is duly elected; if this is not achieved, a second round is organised between the two candidates who received the most votes in the first. Whoever receives the most votes in the second round is then elected. If no candidate had received a majority of the vote, a second round would have been held on 23 April.

In 2010 the Constitution of Djibouti was amended to shorten the length of presidential terms from six years to five; the previously held limit of two terms per president was also abolished.

Candidates 
Incumbent President Ismaïl Omar Guelleh is eligible for a fifth term. The only opposition candidate is Zakaria Ismael Farah of the Mouvement pour le Dévelopment et l'Équilibre de la Nation Djiboutienne (MDEND), with the major opposition candidates opting not to present candidates.

Campaign 
The presidential campaign occurred during the ongoing global COVID-19 pandemic. Guelleh's campaign highlighted the government's response to the pandemic locally, which had been praised by the World Health Organisation. Guelleh's campaign did face criticism for some social issues, including the country's high unemployment rate and concerns that despite a high growth rate of 7% on average over the preceding five years, that the benefits of such growth was being unevenly redistributed, particularly towards the working class.

Farah served as the only opposition candidate, with major opposition parties opting not to run candidates, accusing Guelleh of ruling via a dictatorship.

Results

References

Djibouti
Presidential election
Djibouti
Presidential elections in Djibouti